Mohammad Reza Fallahzadeh is an Iranian senior military officer and politician who is currently deputy commander of Quds Force of IRGC. Fallahzadeh served as the IRGC Quds Force's deputy for coordination affairs before taking the new job. He served as governor of the Yazd Province during presidency of Mahmoud Ahmadinejad.

References

Iranian governors
Islamic Revolutionary Guard Corps personnel of the Iran–Iraq War
Islamic Revolutionary Guard Corps brigadier generals
Iranian individuals subject to the U.S. Department of the Treasury sanctions
People from Yazd Province
1962 births
Living people
Governors of Yazd Province